9th Aerobic Gymnastics World Championships were held in Nanjing, China from 1 to 3 June 2006.

Results

Women's Individual

Men's Individual

Mixed Pair

Trio

Group All-Around

Medal table

References
FIG official site
UEG European Union of Gymnastics Statistics

Aerobic Gymnastics Championships
Aerobic Gymnastics World Championships
International gymnastics competitions hosted by China
Aerobic Gymnastics World Championships 
Aerobic Gymnastics World Championships